Tamel (São Veríssimo) is a Portuguese parish, located in the municipality of Barcelos. The population in 2011 was 3,025, in an area of 3.33 km².

References

Freguesias of Barcelos, Portugal